Diogo Mendes Araújo (born 16 April 1997) is a Portuguese professional basketball player who plays for Sporting CP.

Honours
FC Porto
 Portuguese Cup: 2018–19

References

1997 births
Living people
Portuguese men's basketball players
FC Porto basketball players
Sporting CP basketball players
Small forwards
People from Figueira da Foz
Sportspeople from Coimbra District